The Fremont Historic Commercial District is a  historic district which was listed on the National Register of Historic Places in 1995.  It is roughly bounded by 3rd, Military, Park and D Streets in Fremont, Nebraska.

The district recognizes "an enclave of late 19th- and early 20th-century buildings which represent Fremont's role as a regional center of wholesale and retail commerce."  It is an asymmetrical-shaped district which has parts of seven city blocks in the central business district of Fremont.  The listing included 43 contributing buildings and 27 non-contributing ones.

References

External links

Historic districts on the National Register of Historic Places in Nebraska
National Register of Historic Places in Dodge County, Nebraska
Victorian architecture in Nebraska
Moderne architecture in the United States